AWN may stand for:

 Awn Access to Justice Network in Gaza Strip, Legal Aid Network operate in Gaza Strip, Palestine
 Animation World Network, an online organization for animators
 Avant Window Navigator, a dock-like bar that tracks open windows

Awn may refer to:

 Awn (botany), on a plant, a hair or bristle-like appendage (i.e., an awned appendage)
 Awn hair (mammal), a type of hair on mammals
 Alton Downs Airport, IATA airport code "AWN"